"We Should Be Together" is a song written by Allen Reynolds, and recorded by American country music artist Don Williams.  It was released in March 1974 as the second single from the album Don Williams Volume Two.  The song reached #5 on the Billboard Hot Country Singles & Tracks chart.

Chart performance

References

1974 singles
1974 songs
Don Williams songs
Songs written by Allen Reynolds
Song recordings produced by Allen Reynolds
ABC Records singles